The Federal Institute of Metrology (METAS) is the Swiss national metrology organization. It is part of the Federal Department of Justice and Police.

References

External links 
 

Standards organisations in Switzerland
Federal Department of Justice and Police
Metrology